Jibrin is a surname. Notable people with the surname include:

Abdulmumin Jibrin (born 1976), Nigerian politician, businessman and academic
Augustine Jibrin (born 1988), Nigerian football player
Barau I Jibrin (born 1959), Nigerian politician
Bello Jibrin Gada (born 1954), Nigerian politician
Usman Oyibe Jibrin (born 1959), Nigerian naval officer
Usman Jibrin (1942–2011), Nigerian politician